This is a comprehensive list of victories of the  cycling team. The races are categorized according to the UCI Continental Circuits rules

1993 Mapei
Trofeo Melinda, Stefano Della Santa

1994 Mapei–Clas

Züri-Metzgete, Gianluca Bortolami
UCI Road World Cup, Gianluca Bortolami
 Overall Vuelta a España, Tony Rominger
 Overall Vuelta Ciclista al País Vasco, Tony Rominger
 Overall Paris–Nice, Tony Rominger
One Hour World Record, Tony Rominger

1995 Mapei–GB

Giro Ciclistico d'Italia, Giuseppe di Grande
Critérium Bavikhoeve, Johan Museeuw
Grand Prix Eddy Merckx, Johan Museeuw
Vuelta Ciclista a Murcia, Adriano Baffi
Four Days of Dunkirk, Johan Museeuw
Vuelta a Andalucía, Stefano Dell Santa
Clasica Internacional a Alcobendas
Trofeo Laigueglia, Johan Museeuw
Omloop Het Volk, Franco Ballerini
Cholet-Pays de la Loire, Frank Vandenbroucke
E3 Prijs Vlaanderen, Bart Leysen
Tour of Flanders, Johan Museeuw
Stage 4 Vuelta Ciclista al País Vasco, Tony Rominger
Paris–Roubaix, Franco Ballerini
 Overall Tour de Romandie, Tony Rominger
Prologue, Stages 3 & 4b Tony Rominger
 Overall Giro d'Italia, Tony Rominger
 Points classification, Tony Rominger
 Intermediate Sprints classification, Tony Rominger
Stages 2 (ITT), 4, 10 (ITT) & 17 (ITT), Tony Rominger
Flèche Hesbignonne, Wilfired Pieters
Züri-Metzgete, Johan Museeuw
Druivenkoers Overijse, Johan Museeuw
Schaal Sels – Merksem, Bart Leysen
Critérium Adinkerke, Frank Vandenbroucke
Kampioenschap van Vlaanderen, Johan Museeuw
Prologue, Stage 7 & 20 Vuelta a España, Abraham Olano
Paris–Bruxelles, Frank Vandenbroucke
Stage 19 Vuelta a España, Adriano Baffi
Critérium de Oostrozebeke, Adriano Baffi
 World Road Race championships, Abraham Olano
Paris–Bourges, Daniele Nardello
Subida al Naranco, Abraham Olano
UCI Road World Cup, Johan Museeuw

1996 Mapei–GB

Trofeo Melinda, Andrea Tafi
Amsterdam Derny Race, Franco Ballerini
 National Road Race championships, Manuel Fernández
Critérium Bavikhoeve, Abraham Olano
Critérium Aalst, Tom Steels
Trofeo Manacor, Frederico Colonna
 Overall Tour Méditerranéen, Frank Vandenbroucke
 Overall Tour of Austria, Frank Vandenbroucke
 Overall Circuit Cycliste Sarthe – Pays de la Loire, Adriano Baffi
Roma Maxima, Andrea Tafi
Coppa Placci, Andrea Tafi
 Overall Vuelta a Burgos, Tony Rominger
Milano–Torino, Daniele Nardello
Binche–Tournai–Binche, Frank Vandenbroucke
Trofeo Laigueglia, Frank Vandenbroucke
Omloop Het Volk, Tom Steels
E3 Prijs Vlaanderen, Carlo Bomans
Brabantse Pijl, Johan Museeuw
Paris–Camembert, Adriano Baffi
Paris–Roubaix, Johan Museeuw
Scheldeprijs, Frank Vandenbroucke
 Overall Tour de Romandie, Abraham Olano
Prologue & Stage 5, Abraham Olano
Grand Prix de Wallonie, Franco Ballerini
Binche–Tournai–Binche, Frank Vandenbroucke
 National Road Race championships, Johan Museeuw
Circuito de Getxo, Arsenio Gonzalez
Boucles de l'Aulne, Abraham Olano
GP Ouest France–Plouay, Frank Vandenbroucke
Stage 2 Tour de Pologne, Federico Colonna
Stages 4 & 22 Vuelta a España, Tom Steels
Stages 10 (ITT) & 21 (ITT) Vuelta a España, Tony Rominger
Stage 12 Vuelta a España, Daniele Nardello
Paris–Bruxelles, Andrea Tafi
Subida al Naranco, Francisco Javier Mauleón
 World Road Race championships, Johan Museeuw
Milano–Torino, Daniele Nardello
Giro di Lombardia, Andrea Tafi
UCI Road World Cup, Johan Museeuw

1997 Mapei–GB

GP Tell, Oscar Camenzind
Profronde van Almelo, Tom Steels
Four Days of Dunkirk, Johan Museeuw
Nacht van Peer, Johan Museeuw
Critérium Aalst, Frank Vandenbroucke
Critérium d'Abruzzo, Daniele Nardello
 Overall Tour de Luxembourg, Frank Vandenbroucke
 Overall Volta a Portugal, Zenon Jaskuła
 Overall Tour of Austria, Daniele Nardello
Gala Tour de France, Johan Museeuw
Kuurne–Brussels–Kuurne, Johan Museeuw
Stages 1, 2, 4 & 8a Paris–Nice, Tom Steels
Brabantse Pijl, Gianluca Pianegonda
KBC Driedaagse van De Panne – Koksijde, Johan Museeuw
Stage 1 Vuelta Ciclista al País Vasco, Gabriele Missaglia
Stages 3 & 5a Vuelta Ciclista al País Vasco, Stefano Zanini
 Overall Tour de Romandie, Pavel Tonkov
Stage 1, Giuseppe di Grande
Stage 4, Pavel Tonkov
Stages 3 (ITT), 5 & 21 Giro d'Italia, Pavel Tonkov
Stage 11 Giro d'Italia, Gabriele Missaglia
Stage 12 Giro d'Italia, Giuseppe Di Grande
Rund um Köln, Frank Vandenbroucke
Giro dell'Appennino, Pavel Tonkov
Stages 1 & 9 Tour de Suisse, Oscar Camenzind
Stages 1a, 2 & 4 Volta Ciclista a Catalunya,
Stage 7 Tour de Suisse, Tom Steels
 National Road Race championships, Gianni Faresin
 National Road Race championships, Oscar Camenzind
 National Road Race championships, Tom Steels
Trofeo Matteotti, Frank Vandenbroucke
Wincanton Classic, Andrea Tafi
Schaal Sels – Merksem, Tom Steels
Grand Prix de Fourmies, Andrea Tafi
Stages 11, 16 & 17, Vuelta a España, Ján Svorada
Stages 13 & 15, Vuelta a España, Pavel Tonkov
Coppa Sabatini, Andrea Tafi
Gran Premio Bruno Beghelli, Stefano Zanini

1998 Mapei–Bricobi

Settimana Ciclistica Lombarda, Pavel Tonkov
Criterium Bavikhoeve, Andrea Tafi
Overall Tour de Wallonne, Frank Vandenbroucke
Roma Maxima, Andrea Tafi
Criterium Aalst, Tom Steels
Clasica de Ordizia, Frank Vandenbroucke
 Overall Tour de Langkawi, Gabriele Missaglia
Gran Premio Bruno Beghelli, Stefano Zanini
 Overall Paris–Nice, Frank Vandenbroucke
Prologue & Stage 4, Frank Vandenbroucke
Stages 2 & 3, Tom Steels
Stage 3 Tirreno–Adriatico, Ján Svorada
Dwars door Vlaanderen, Tom Steels
Stage3a KBC Driedaagse van De Panne – Koksijde, Stefano Zanini
E3 Prijs Vlaanderen, Johan Museeuw
Brabantse Pijl, Johan Museeuw
Ronde van Vlaanderen, Johan Museeuw
Gent–Wevelgem, Frank Vandenbroucke
Paris–Roubaix, Franco Ballerini
Stage 18 Giro d'Italia, Pavel Tonkov
Stages 2, 13, 19 & 22 Tour de France, Tom Steels
Giro dell'Appennino, Pavel Tonkov
Memorial Rik Van Steenbergen, Tom Steels
 National road Race championships, Tom Steels
 National road Race championships, Andrea Tafi
 National road Race championships, Ján Svorada
Stage 3 Tour de France, Ján Svorada
Stage 14 Tour de France, Daniele Nardello
Gran Premio Città di Camaiore, Andrea Tafi
Stage 1 Tour de Pologne,
Coppa Ugo Agostoni, Andrea Tafi
Stage 12 Vuelta a España, Gianni Bugno
Paris–Bruxelles, Stefano Zanini
Gran Premio Bruno Beghelli, Stefano Zanini
Critérium de Oostrozebeke, Tom Steels
 World Road Race championships, Oscar Camenzind
n Wilfried Pieters
Giro di Lombardia, Oscar Camenzind

1999 Mapei–Quick Step

Criterium Bavikhoeve, Johan Museeuw
Giro della Provincia di Lucca, Paolo Bettini
 Overall Tour de Langkawi, Paolo Lanfranchi
Stage 4 Volta a la Comunidad Valenciana,  Michele Bartoli
Stage 5a Volta a la Comunidad Valenciana, Stefano Zanini
Stage 1 Vuelta Ciclista a Murcia, Davide Bramati
Stage 1 Guldensporentweedaagse, Wilfried Pieters
 Overall Tirreno–Adriatico, Michele Bartoli
Stage 4, Paolo Bettini
Stage 8 Paris–Nice, Tom Steels
Dwars door Vlaanderen, Johan Museeuw
Stage 4 Setmana Catalana de Ciclisme, Giuliano Figueras
De Brabantse Pijl, Johan Museeuw
Stage 1 KBC Driedaagse van De Panne – Koksijde, Tom Steels
GP de la Ville de Rennes, Max van Heeswijk
Stage 2 Vuelta Ciclista al País Vasco, Giuliano Figueras
Gent–Wevelgem, Tom Steels
Paris–Roubaix, Andrea Tafi
La Flèche Wallonne, Michele Bartoli
Overall Giro di Toscana, Luca Scinto
Stage 1 Tour de Romandie, Giuliano Figueras
Stages 2, 3 & 17 Tour de France, Tom Steels
Memorial Rik Van Steenbergen, Giuliano Figueras
Stage 11 Vuelta a España, Daniele Nardello
Paris–Bourges, Daniele Nardello
Giro del Piemonte, Andrea Tafi

2000 Mapei–Quick Step

Overall Tour de Wallonie, Axel Merckx
Criterium Aalst, Axel Merckx
Trofeo Manacor, Paolo Bettini
Gran Premio di Chiasso, Giuliano Figueras
Trofeo Palma de Mallorca, Óscar Freire
Stage 4 Tour Méditerranéen, Tom Steels
Trofeo Laigueglia, Daniele Nardello
Stage 2 Vuelta a Andalucia – Ruta Ciclista Del Sol, Michele Bartoli
 Overall Tour du Haut Var, Daniele Nardello
Stage 3 Volta a la Comunidad Valenciana, Óscar Freire
Omloop Het Volk, Johan Museeuw
Stages 1 & 6 Tirreno–Adriatico, Óscar Freire
De Brabantse Pijl, Johan Museeuw
Stage 2 KBC Driedaagse van De Panne – Koksijde, Tom Steels
Stage 3 Vuelta al País Vasco, Stefano Zanini
Paris–Roubaix, Johan Museeuw
Liège–Bastogne–Liège, Paolo Bettini
Stage 5 Four Days of Dunkirk, Fred Rodriguez
Stage 4 Tour de Romandie, Andrea Noè
Prologue Tour of Slovenia, László Bodrogi
Stage 2 Tour of Slovenia, Dario Cioni
Stage 8 Giro d'Italia, Axel Merckx
Stage 19 Giro d'Italia, Paolo Lanfranchi
Stage 2 Tour de Suisse, Fred Rodriguez
Stage 10 Tour de Suisse, Stefano Zanini
 National Road Race championships, Michele Bartoli
 National Road Race championships, László Bodrogi
 National Road Race championships, Axel Merckx
 National Road Race championships, Fred Rodriguez
 National Time Trial championships, László Bodrogi
Stage 2 & 3 Tour de France, Tom Steels
Stage 9 Tour de France, Paolo Bettini
Stage 21 Tour de France, Stefano Zanini
GP Ouest France – Plouay, Michele Bartoli
Stage 5 Ronde van Nederland, Max van Heeswijk
Stages 2 & 4 Vuelta a España, Óscar Freire
Stage 17 Vuelta a España, Davide Bramati
Paris–Bruxelles, Max van Heeswijk
Circuit Franco-Belge, Daniele Nardello
Paris–Tours, Andrea Tafi

2001 Mapei–Quick Step

Coppa Placci, Paolo Bettini
Volta ao Alentejo, László Bodrogi
GP de Waregem, Stijn Devolder
 Overall Tour de Langkawi, Paolo Lanfranchi
Prologue, Stages 8 & 9, Paolo Lanfranchi
Stages 3 & 11, Paolo Bettini
Tour du Haut Var, Daniele Nardello
Omloop Het Volk, Michele Bartoli
GP Città di Lugano, Luca Paolini
Vlaamse Pijl, Stijn Devolder
Stage 2 Vuelta Ciclista al País Vasco, Stefano Zanini
Stage 5a Vuelta Ciclista al País Vasco, Stefano Garzelli
Stage 2 Internationale Niedersachsen-Rundfahrt, Pedro Horrillo
Stage 1 Tour of Slovenia, Stefano Zanini
Stage 7 Giro d'Italia, Stefano Zanini
Stage 1 Deutschland Tour, Tom Steels
Stage 4 Deutschland Tour, Óscar Freire
Stages 1b & 2 Tour of Sweden, Tom Steels
Stage 4 Tour of Sweden, László Bodrogi
Stage 7 Tour de Suisse, Stefano Garzelli
 National Road Race championships, Daniele Nardello
 National Time Trial championships, László Bodrogi
Gran Premio Città di Camaiore, Michele Bartoli
Stage 2 Tour de l'Ain, Evgeni Petrov
Züri-Metzgete, Paolo Bettini
 World Road Race championships, Óscar Freire

2002 Mapei–Quick Step

Criterium Bavikhoeve, Paolo Bettini
Roma Maxima, Paolo Bettini
Trofeo Manacor, Óscar Freire
Omloop van het Houtland Lichtervelde, Kevin Hulsman
Grand Prix Eddy Merckx, László Bodrogi
Giro del Piemonte, Luca Paolini
Stage 5 Tour Down Under, Cadel Evans
Stages 1, 2 & 5 Tour de Langkawi, Robbie Hunter
Prologue Paris–Nice, László Bodrogi
Stage 2 Tirreno–Adriatico, Paolo Bettini
Overall GP Erik Breukink, Fabian Cancellara
Stage 4, Fabian Cancellara
De Brabantse Pijl, Fabian De Waele
Stage 1 KBC Driedaagse van De Panne – Koksijde, Stefano Zanini
Tour of Flanders, Andrea Tafi
GP Industria & Artigianato di Larciano
Stage 6 Four Days of Dunkirk, Tom Steels
ZLM Tour, Fabian Cancellara
Liège–Bastogne–Liège, Paolo Bettini
Stages 2 & 5 Giro d'Italia, Stefano Garzelli
Stage 1 Euskal Bizikleta, Pedro Horrillo
Stage 1a Tour of Austria, Fabian Cancellara
Stage 6 Volta Ciclista a Catalunya, Tom Steels
 National Road Race championships, Tom Steels
 National Time Trial championships, László Bodrogi
Stage 6 Volta Ciclista a Catalunya, Tom Steels
Stage 2 Tour de France, Óscar Freire
Stage 1 Tour de Wallonie, Óscar Freire
Stage 2b Rothaus Regio-Tour International, Paolo Bettini
Stage 4a Tour of Denmark, Elio Aggiano
Stage 4b Tour of Denmark, László Bodrogi
Tre Valli Varesine, Eddy Ratti
Coppa Bernocchi, Daniele Nardello
Stage 5 Tour du Poitou Charentes et de la Vienne, Elio Aggiano
Stages 1 & 2 Tour de Pologne, Robbie Hunter
Stage 1 Circuit Franco-Belge, Kevin Hulsmans
 National Time Trial championships, Fabian Cancellara
UCI Road World Cup, Paolo Bettini

Supplementary statistics
Source:

References

MAP